Ramauli Bairiya (रमौली बैरिया) is a village development committee in Rautahat District, Narayani Zone of southeastern Nepal. It had a population of 6,377 people, in 918 individual households, as of the nation's 2011 census.

Populated places in Rautahat District